"Carnaval de Paris" is a song by English electronic music trio Dario G. The song was recorded for the 1998 FIFA World Cup in France and was released as a single on 18 May 1998 in Europe. The following month, the track was issued in the United Kingdom and peaked at number five on the UK Singles Chart.

Origins
The origins of the melody come from the world of football. During a 1996 pre-season tour of The Netherlands, Sheffield Wednesday F.C. picked up on a chant sung by the fans of FC Utrecht, with a tune inspired by the folk ballad "Oh My Darling, Clementine". This was then adapted and brought back to England for the following 1996–97 FA Premier League. The chant was sung extensively at the home game with Nottingham Forest on 18 November 1996 helped by the club's resident band. This was slowly picked up by other clubs in the Premier League, helped by the use of it at England matches (where the Sheffield Wednesday band were now invited to play). Sheffield Wednesday had already lost their "barmy army" chant to the England cricket team and also other football clubs. In an effort to either stem this spread of the song (or just to keep it unique), the fans of Sheffield Wednesday added their own lyrics to the theme (which continues to this day). This happened around the time of the Dario G single release.

Usage
The song, however, has now spread around the world, starting when fans of the U.S. men's national team used the tune in their first match after the September 11 attacks in a World Cup qualifier in Foxborough, Massachusetts against Jamaica. Amongst the supporters' clubs which have used the tune have been those in Portsmouth, Leicester City F.C., Chicago Fire, VfL Bochum, Wellington Phoenix, Sydney FC, D.C. United and S.L. Benfica. In fact, Section 8 Chicago, a supporters' club for Chicago Fire, supplied lyrics for the previously instrumental tune. Rugby League rivals St. Helen's RLFC and Wigan Warriors both play it after a successful try conversion.

This song also appears like the soundtrack in the menu of Pro Evolution Soccer 2014, the video game by Konami.
The song was also used in Ford adverts for the UEFA Champions League from 2001 to 2005.

Music video
The music video features children painted in the colours of the representative countries participating in the tournament. For example, it depicts a group of Scottish children kicking off a match against Brazilian children while playing Scottish Bagpipes, mirroring the opening game at France 1998. A subsequent scene involving Jamaican children is set to music with steel drums.

Track listings

UK CD single
 "Carnaval de Paris" (radio mix) – 3:58
 "Carnaval de Paris" (SRS radio edit) – 3:57
 "Carnaval de Paris" (12-inch mix) – 5:05
 "Carnaval de Paris" (SRS mix) – 5:00
 "Carnaval de Paris" (Tall Paul mix) – 8:11
 "Carnaval de Paris" (JDS 6-inch mix) – 6:41

UK 12-inch single
A1. "Carnaval de Paris" (SRS mix) – 5:00
A2. "Carnaval de Paris" (JDS 6-inch mix) – 6:41
B1. "Carnaval de Paris" (Tall Paul mix) – 8:11

UK cassette single
 "Carnaval de Paris" (SRS mix) – 5:00
 "Carnaval de Paris" (12-inch mix) – 5:05

European CD single
 "Carnaval de Paris" (radio mix) – 3:58
 "Carnaval de Paris" (SRS mix) – 5:00

Australian CD single
 "Carnaval de Paris" (radio mix) – 3:58
 "Carnaval de Paris" (SRS radio edit) – 3:57
 "Carnaval de Paris" (12-inch mix) – 5:05
 "Carnaval de Paris" (SRS mix) – 5:00
 "Carnaval de Paris" (Tall Paul mix) – 8:11
 "Carnaval de Paris" (JDS 6-inch mix) – 6:41
 "Sunchyme" (Sash! remix edit) – 3:33

Credits and personnel
Credits are lifted from the UK CD single liner notes.

Studios
 Pre-produced at Sunchyme Studios (Cheshire, England) from September 1997 to January 1998
 Recorded and mixed at Lansdowne Studios (London, England) from January to April 1998
 Mastered at Masterpiece (London, England)

Personnel

 Paul Spencer – writing
 Scott Rosser – writing
 Stephen Spencer – writing
 Ebony Steel Band – steel drums
 Bob Murphy – bagpipes
 John Themis – Chung ruan, Spanish guitars
 Andy Duncan – Battacuda and Latin percussion
 Pete Thoms – trombone
 Stuart Brooks – trumpet
 Kieran Kiely – accordion

 Stephen Wick – tuba
 Victoria C'espedes – sikus (Bolivian pan-pipes)
 Peter Oxendale – production
 Dario G – co-production, arrangement, mixing
 Mark Tucker – mixing, engineering
 Steve Pelluet – assistant engineering
 Jacko – mastering
 Edd – artwork design
 Paul Myatt – photography

Charts

Weekly charts

Year-end charts

Release history

References

1998 singles
2002 singles
Dario G songs
FIFA World Cup songs
Number-one singles in Scotland